Season 2008–09 for Hibernian was their tenth consecutive season of play in the Scottish Premier League. The SPL season began on 9 August 2008 with a 1–0 defeat at Kilmarnock. The team were eliminated from each cup competition at the first hurdle, due to defeats by IF Elfsborg in the last Intertoto Cup, Greenock Morton in the Scottish League Cup and Edinburgh derby rivals Hearts in the Scottish Cup. The team was inconsistent in the league, and only squeezed into the top six by a single point ahead of Motherwell. This led to the resignation of manager Mixu Paatelainen at the end of the season. One bright spot for the club was the performance of the under-19 team, which won the Scottish league & cup double.

Pre-season
Hibs manager Mixu Paatelainen announced during May 2008 that the Hibs players would only have four weeks off after the end of the 2007–08 season, giving them two weeks to prepare for the first Intertoto Cup game. Hibs entered the last Intertoto Cup competition at the second round stage. They were drawn to play IF Elfsborg, who defeated Hibs 4–0 on aggregate, 2–0 at both Easter Road and the Borås Arena. Hibs lost a glamour friendly 6–0 against Barcelona at Murrayfield Stadium on 24 July.

Hibs then also lost a friendly to Third Division club Cowdenbeath. This prompted media speculation that Mixu Paatelainen would resign from his position as manager, which was denied. Hibs then suffered another heavy defeat, 3–0 to First Division club Clyde, before finally scoring their first goal of the season in a 3–2 defeat to Premier League club Middlesbrough. Hibs completed their programme of friendlies with a 1–0 defeat against Wigan Athletic.

Results

League season
Having suffered through a very poor pre-season, Hibs were under pressure to get off to a good start in the Scottish Premier League, but they lost their first game 1–0 at Kilmarnock. The team then bounced back with an entertaining 3–2 win at Easter Road against Falkirk, but drew with Inverness Caledonian Thistle and lost 1–0 at home to Motherwell. The Scotland on Sunday reported after the latter result that Hibs' "lack of quality" was the reason for their poor results. Hibs bounced back to record back to back wins over Dundee United (2–1) and Hamiton (1–0). However, in their next game, Hibs lost 3–0 at home to Rangers. The team then travelled to Pittodrie to face Aberdeen where the Hibees won 2–1 with two goals from Riordan.

An international break followed as Scotland drew 0–0 with Norway. The next game back was the first Edinburgh derby of the season, played at Easter Road. Steven Fletcher gave Hibs an early lead and it looked as though they would go on to score more. However, the game went on to be a tight affair and Hearts equalised from a Bruno Aguiar free-kick. The game finished 1–1 after both teams missed chance after chance to take the bragging rights of Edinburgh. The draw in the derby started a run of six games without a win for Hibs, including defeats by Celtic (4–2), Inverness (2–1) and Dundee United (2–0). In the last game of the run, Hibs came from 2–0 to draw 2–2 with Aberdeen. The winless run was ended emphatically when Hibs won 4–1 at Motherwell. Hibs then built on that win by drawing at Falkirk and beating Celtic and Hamilton Academical at home.

After that, however, Hibs went on another very poor run of results, winning only one win of their next nine league matches. Put together with the early exit from the Scottish Cup, this run of form increased the pressure on manager Mixu Paatelainen. This pressure was eased somewhat by league wins against Hamilton and Hearts, which was a first Edinburgh derby win for Paatelainen as Hibs manager. Despite Hibs failing to win any of their last four games before the split, Motherwell's 2–0 defeat by St Mirren meant that Hibs squeezed into the top six by a single point.

A home defeat by Dundee United in the first game after the split effectively ended Hibs' chances of qualifying for the Europa League. The team then enjoyed some unexpectedly good results, winning the last derby of the season at Tynecastle, and holding both halves of the Old Firm to draws at Easter Road.

Results

Final table

Scottish League Cup 
Having failed to qualify for European competition in the previous season, Hibs entered the Scottish League Cup in the second round. They were drawn at home to First Division club Morton, but suffered a shock 4–3 defeat after extra time.

Two decisions by referee Iain Brines during the second period of extra time were perceived to be wrong by Mixu Paatelainen. The first decision was to award Morton a penalty kick for handball by Dean Shiels, which led to their third goal. The second decision was to award a direct free kick against Chris Hogg, which led to the fourth and winning Morton goal. The incident involving Hogg caused him to suffer from headaches, which eventually forced Hogg to stop playing for nearly a month.

Paatelainen threw a towel to the ground in disgust at the referee's decisions, which prompted Brines to send the Hibs manager to the stands. The SFA subsequently banned Paatelainen from the technical area for four SPL matches.

Results

Scottish Cup 

Hibs were drawn at home to Edinburgh derby rivals Hearts in the fourth round of the Scottish Cup. Hearts won the game 2–0 to extend Hibs' drought in the competition another year. Steven Fletcher was sent off by referee Craig Thomson for a lunging tackle on Hearts captain Christophe Berra during the first half while the match was still goalless. Hibs manager Mixu Paatelainen was critical of the referee's decision, and stated his belief that Hibs were the better side until the sending off.

Results

Transfers

There was expected to be something of a clear-out of players during the 2008 summer transfer window because manager Mixu Paatelainen stated that he wanted to reduce the size of the first team squad from 32 players to around 25 players. Paatelainen began this process by releasing four players who had been out on loan during the 2007–08 season. He also released left-back Abderraouf Zarabi, who had only been signed a few months previously. Key midfielder Guillaume Beuzelin signed for Coventry City under freedom of contract.

Right-back David van Zanten signed for Hibs, having made a pre-contract agreement to sign when his contract with St Mirren expired. Fabián Yantorno was given access to Hibs' medical facilities with a view to him signing when he recovered from a long-term injury sustained whilst playing for Gretna, and he signed for Hibs in August. Former Nantes youth player Steven Thicot and former Chelsea player Joe Keenan were taken on trial and signed on in July.

Hibs then trimmed their squad on the final day of the summer transfer window by releasing Martin Canning, Brian Kerr and Zibi Malkowski, but they brought in Dunfermline central defender Souleymane Bamba. Mixu Paatelainen was quoted as expecting a "busy day", which was highlighted when Derek Riordan completed a much-anticipated return from Celtic.

On 13 November, Hibs announced that they had signed Jonatan Johansson to a pre-contract agreement. Johansson was included in the squad from the start of January 2009, and made his debut in the Edinburgh derby played on 3 January. Former Dundee United goalkeeper Grzegorz Szamotulski signed a deal with Hibs until the end of the season. Thierry Gathuessi and Filipe Morais, who had both been signed by John Collins in the summer of 2007 but fell out of favour under Mixu Paatelainen, were released on 8 January and both signed deals with Inverness Caledonian Thistle until the end of the season.

Players in

Players out

Loans in

Loans out

Player stats 
During the 2008–09 season, Hibs used 30 different players in competitive games. The table below shows the number of appearances and goals scored by each player.

|}

See also
List of Hibernian F.C. seasons

References

Hibernian F.C. seasons
Hibernian